Suriyawan is a town and a nagar panchayat in Sant Ravidas Nagar district in the Indian state of Uttar Pradesh.

Demographics 
 India census, Suriyawan had a population of 17,014. Males constitute 53% of the population and females 47%. In Suriyawan, 17% of the population is under 6 years of age. The 3 times one digit  AIR holder, Vikas Kumar is also from this town.

References 

Cities and towns in Bhadohi district